In Greek mythology, Hegemone ( means "mastery" derived from hegemon "leader, ruler, queen") was a Greek goddess of plants, specifically making them bloom and bear fruit. According to Pausanias, Hegemone was a name given by the Athenians to one of the Graces. Auxo represented the spring, and Hegemone autumn.

Myths and legends 
Hegemone was known for creating plants that would bloom and bear fruit. She is often associated with the season of autumn, along with Carpho, who is known to bring plants to their state of harvest.

Hegemone was the eldest of the elder Charites, worshipped alongside Auxo, representing the spring. Hegemone was worshipped in Boeotian Orchomenus - known as Viota in modern mainland Greece - in the form of pieces of meteorites.

Genealogy 
Hegemone is generally considered to be a descendant of Zeus and the Oceanid, Eurynome, though sources vary. She is sometimes referred to as a descendant of "The Sun", likely referring to either Apollo or Helios.

Other 
Hegemone is at the origin of the word hegemony and one of Jupiter's moon.

References

Greek goddesses
Fertility goddesses
Harvest goddesses
Nature goddesses